Budhrail is a village in the south-eastern part of Jagannathpur Upazila under Sunamganj District, Bangladesh. It is approximately a one-hour drive from the city of Sylhet and a one and a half hour drive from Sunamganj. The village is in the middle of the Syedpur Shaharpara Union Parishad and is on the bank of the Ratna river.

Geography
The total area of the Village is 1.135 km2. Budhrail village is bounded by Syedpur on the north, Islampur and Anuchand on the south, Sunathonpur and Shaharpara on the east, and Muradabad, Syedpur and Thegoria on the west.

Education
The oldest primary school in this area is Budhrail Govt. Primary School. It was established in 1795 or earlier.
 Budhrail Govt. Primary School
 Darul Ulum Muradabad and Budhrail Madrasha

Institutions
Budhrail has a very old health center called Budhrail Govt. Health Center. It was established around 1930–40. 
 Budhrail Govt. Health Center
 Budhrail Government Primary School
 Budhrail Jame Mosjid
 Uttar Budhrail Jame Mosjid

Gallery

See also
 List of villages in Bangladesh
 Syedpur Shaharpara Union

References

Villages in Jagannathpur Upazila